Tang Guoliang (born 10 April 1969) is a Chinese biathlete. He competed in the men's 20 km individual event at the 1992 Winter Olympics.

References

1969 births
Living people
Chinese male biathletes
Olympic biathletes of China
Biathletes at the 1992 Winter Olympics
Place of birth missing (living people)